The North of England Men's Lacrosse Association Senior Flags, known as the Senior Flags, is an annual knockout club cup competition played for by teams in the North of England Men's Premiership. It is the oldest lacrosse club competition in the world. The Senior Flags is organised by the North of England Men's Lacrosse Association, a committee of the English Lacrosse Association.

Past Winners 1883-1945

Past Winners 1946-2022

References

Further reading
Melland, Charles H. (1939) "The University Lacrosse Club", in: The Journal of the University of Manchester, vol. 1, no. 3, pp. 74–76

Lacrosse in England
Lacrosse tournaments
Sports competitions in England
1883 establishments in England
Recurring sporting events established in 1883